The St. Lawrence Saints women's ice hockey program represents St. Lawrence University in Canton, New York. The Saints play at Appleton Arena and are part of the Eastern College Athletic Conference. In 2001, St. Lawrence participated in the inaugural NCAA Championship tournament. Their current head coach is St. Lawrence alumnus Chris Wells, who played for the 1992 men’s championship ice hockey team.

History

Beginning as a club team, the women's program has seen great success since entering Division I in 1997.  Currently, the team has made five Frozen Four appearances in the eight years since the creation of a Women's NCAA Division I tournament. With the women's appearance in inaugural Frozen Four (2001), St. Lawrence became the first school to have both their men and women's programs in the NCAA Division I ice hockey tournament in the same year. The women's team also recorded the first ever win in the history of the NCAA Women's Frozen Four.

The first women's hockey game was played in 1974, as a club program.  The women's team transitioned to a Division III program in 1979, and won three consecutive ECAC Division III tournaments in 1990, 1991, and 1992.

Following the 2007–08 season, Head Coach Paul Flanagan left St. Lawrence to a position with Syracuse University. Flanagan was the women's program's all-time winningest coach with a nine-season record of 230–83–24.  Then Men's Associate Head Coach, Chris Wells was appointed to replace him and in his first season coached the team to a berth in the national championship tournament with a record of 24–11–3.

Year by year

Source

Coaches

Current Roster

2022–23 Saints
As of September 15, 2022.

Notable players
Isabelle Chartrand
Sabrina Harbec
Gina Kingsbury, (remains in the University's top-5 in career points (152) and goals (74)) and holds the school record with nine points in a game (4 goals, 5 assists)

Olympians
Isabelle Chartrand : Ice hockey at the 2002 Winter Olympics – Women's tournament
Gina Kingsbury, : 2006 and 2010 Olympics
Former St. Lawrence University women's hockey assistant coach Jodi McKenna was an assistant for Team USA at the 2010 Olympics, which won the silver medal.
When Gina Kingsbury won her first gold medal with Canada in 2006, she became the third St. Lawrence alumnus-athlete to win an Olympic gold medal. Her jersey number for Canada is 27, the same number that she had while skating for St. Lawrence.  Fellow hockey player, Isabelle Chartrand was the second St. Lawrence alumnus who won an Olympic gold medal (doing so with Canada's women in 2002). The first St. Lawrence alum was Ed Rimkus, who won gold in 1932.

International
Grace Harrison, Goaltender : 2019 IIHF Women's World Championship Division II, Group B – Silver Medal

Scoring leaders

Awards and honors
Rachel Barrie, 2003 Sarah Devens Award   
Brittony Chartier, 2010 Frozen Four Skills Competition participant
Marianna Locke, 2009 Sarah Devens Award
Meghan Maguire, Defense,  2002 ECAC North Second Team
Britni Smith, Defense, 2009 Second Team All-ECAC 
Britni Smith, Pre-Season 2009–10 All-ECAC Team
Britni Smith, 2010 Frozen Four Skills Competition participant
Grace Harrison: Women's Hockey Commissioners Association Division I Goaltender of the Month for January 2019

ECAC Awards
Rachel Barrie, Goalie, 2002 ECAC North First Team
Rachel Barrie, 2002 ECAC-North Goalie of the Year
Alison Domenico, Forward, 2009 Second Team All-ECAC 
Alison Domenico, 2009 ECAC Best Defensive Forward 
Gina Kingsbury, Forward, 2002 ECAC North First Team
Gina Kingsbury, two-time ECAC All-Conference

ECAC All-Rookie Team
Lucy Morgan, 2019–20 ECAC All-Rookie Team Selection

ECAC All-Tournament Team
Sabrina Harbec, 2007 ECAC All-Tournament team

ECAC Monthly Awards
 Taylor Lum, ECAC Adirondack Health Rookie of the Month (March 2021)

ECAC Weekly Awards
Jamie Goldsmith, ECAC Rookie of the Week (Week of October 12, 2009)
Kelly Sabatine, ECAC Rookie of the Week (Week of October 19, 2009)
Kayla Sullivan, ECAC Rookie of the Week (Week of October 26, 2009)
Rachel Bjorgan, Adirondack Health Rookie of the Week (Awarded March 8, 2021)
Kayla Vespa, ECAC Hockey Player of the Week (St. Lawrence) (awarded October 21, 2019)

All-America honors
Isabelle Chartrand, Second Team All-America honors (2001)
Gina Kingsbury, All-America honors (2004)
Rebecca Russell, All-America honors (2005)
Sabrina Harbec, First Team All-America selection (2006)
Annie Guay, Second Team All-America selection (2006)
Sabrina Harbec, All-America honors (2007, 2008)
Annie Guay, All-America honors (2007, 2008)
Brooke Webster, ACHA Women's CCM Hockey Division I Second Team All-America

Patty Kazmaier Award finalists

In 2005, Harbec was a top three finalist for the Patty Kazmaier Memorial Award. She was the first St. Lawrence player to be a finalist for the award.

Saints in professional hockey

See also
 List of college women's ice hockey coaches with 250 wins (Paul Flanagan ranks ninth on all-time list)
 St. Lawrence Saints men's ice hockey

References

 
Ice hockey teams in New York (state)